Giovanni Tommaso Maria Marelli, C.O. (1673–1752) was a Roman Catholic prelate who served as Archbishop (Personal Title) of Imola (1739–1752)
and Archbishop of Urbino (1716–1739).

Biography
Giovanni Tommaso Maria Marelli was born in Robassomero, Italy on 2 Jul 1673 and ordained a priest in the Oratory of Saint Philip Neri on 21 Dec 1697.
On 7 Dec 1716, he was appointed during the papacy of Pope Clement XI as Archbishop of Urbino.
On 21 Dec 1716, he was consecrated bishop by Sebastiano Antonio Tanara, Cardinal-Bishop of Frascati, with Filippo Carlo Spada, Bishop of Pesaro, and Antonio Polcenigo, Bishop of Feltre, serving as co-consecrators. 
On 23 Feb 1739, he was appointed during the papacy of Pope Clement XII as Archbishop (Personal Title) of Imola.
He served as Archbishop of Imola until his death on 9 Feb 1752.

While bishop, he was the principal co-consecrator of Bartolomeo Fargna, Titular Bishop of Emmaüs (1729).

References

External links and additional sources
 (for Chronology of Bishops) 
 (for Chronology of Bishops) 

18th-century Italian Roman Catholic archbishops
Bishops appointed by Pope Clement XI
Bishops appointed by Pope Clement XII
1673 births
1752 deaths